İlkay Dikmen (born February 2, 1981 in Izmir, Turkey) is a Turkish swimmer competing in the breaststroke events.
 is a member of Fenerbahçe Swimming in Istanbul.

She was born to Atilla and İlknur Dikmen in Izmir. She has a younger brother Eray.
 
In 1992, she became the Turkish champion in her age group in the 100 m and 200 m breaststroke, the 100 m backstroke, the 100 m freestyle and the 200 m individual medley events. She swam in the swimming team of Fenerbahçe during the last two years of high school.

After completing the high school in Turkey, she went to Champaign, Illinois, United States for university education. Between 2000 and 2003, Dikmen swam for the University of Illinois' sports team  Illinois Fighting Illini. She contributed to her school's success and set also a school record in the 200-yard breaststroke event.

Dikmen took part at the 100 m breaststroke and 200 m breaststroke events of the 2000 Summer Olympics and 2004 Summer Olympics. In July 2004, she carried the Olympic torch in Istanbul.

At the European Short Course Swimming Championships 2005 held in Trieste, Italy, she set a national record in 200 m breaststroke with 2:27.98.

Achievements

Honors
 2003 Illinois Swimming Association Swimmer of the Year

References

1981 births
Sportspeople from İzmir
Living people
Turkish female breaststroke swimmers
Turkish female swimmers
Fenerbahçe swimmers
Illinois Fighting Illini women's swimmers
Olympic swimmers of Turkey
Swimmers at the 2000 Summer Olympics
Swimmers at the 2004 Summer Olympics
Mediterranean Games silver medalists for Turkey
Swimmers at the 2001 Mediterranean Games
Mediterranean Games medalists in swimming
21st-century Turkish sportswomen